Oh Yeon-soo (born October 27, 1971) is a South Korean actress.

Career
Oh Yeon-soo made her debut in 1989 among a batch of actors who passed an open audition by broadcaster MBC, and she soon became popular for her innocent image. But since her marriage to fellow actor Son Ji-chang, Oh has had a career renaissance doing more mature roles. She played a single mother who rediscovers love in A Second Proposal, a discontented housewife in a rivalry with a top ballerina in The Queen Returns, and was cast as strong, supporting characters in the historical dramas Jumong, and Gyebaek. But Oh became best known for memorably portraying married women exploring adultery in the dark melodramas Bitter Sweet Life, and Bad Guy.

In 2022, she returned to small screen with after five years in Military Prosecutor Doberman. She portrayed a villainous military division commander who was the very first woman to achieve that position since the army founding.

Filmography

Television series

Film

Variety shows
My Little Old Boy (2017) (Special Host, ep.42 & 43)
 Carefree Travellers 2 (2018) (ep.12 to 15)
 I Need Women (2021, SBS) - Main Cast

Awards
2010 3rd Style Icon Awards: Fashionista
2006 MBC Drama Awards: Special Award, Actress in a Large-scale Historical Drama (Jumong)
2004 KBS Drama Awards: Top Excellence Award, Actress (A Second Proposal)
2003 37th Taxpayer's Day: Presidential Citation
1998 MBC Drama Awards: Top Excellence Award, Actress
1993 KBS Drama Awards: Excellence Award, Actress
1993 29th Baeksang Arts Awards: Best New Actress (Film) (General's Son III)
1992 13th Blue Dragon Film Awards: Best New Actress (General's Son III)
1992 3rd Chunsa Film Art Awards: Best New Actress (Women Upstairs, Men Downstairs)
1991 27th Baeksang Arts Awards: Best New Actress (TV)
1990 MBC Drama Awards: Best New Actress

References

External links

 
 
 
 
 

1971 births
Living people
South Korean television actresses
South Korean film actresses